Kostner station could refer to three current or former Chicago "L" stations:

 Kostner station (CTA Pink Line)
 Kostner station (CTA Congress Line)
 Kostner station (CTA Niles Center Line)